A by-election for the seat of Stuart in the Northern Territory Legislative Assembly was held on 23 September 2006. The by-election was triggered by the resignation of Labor member Peter Toyne, the Minister for Health, on 29 August 2006 due to ill health. The seat had been held by the Labor Party since 1983, with Toyne as the member since 1996.

The Labor Party selected indigenous policy adviser Karl Hampton as its candidate. The opposition Country Liberal Party endorsed two candidates, while three independents also contested, including the CLP's 2005 candidate Anna Machado. Hampton easily won the by-election.

Results

§ The combined CLP vote was 20.3%, a decrease of 8.4% from the 2005 result.

References

2006 elections in Australia
Northern Territory by-elections
2000s in the Northern Territory